Michele Tricca (born 26 April 1993) is an Italian sprinter, specialized in the 400 metres.

Biography
Michele Tricca won a medal at the 2013 Mediterranean Games. At youth level he won a medal at the Gymnasiade (Doha 2009) and two medals at the 2011 European Athletics Junior Championships held in Tallinn.

Achievements

National titles
 Italian Athletics Indoor Championships
 400 metres: 2019, 2020

See also
 Italian national track relay team

References

External links
 
 
 Michele Tricca at FIDAL 

1993 births
Living people
Italian male sprinters
Athletics competitors of Fiamme Gialle
Mediterranean Games gold medalists for Italy
Athletes (track and field) at the 2013 Mediterranean Games
Athletes (track and field) at the 2018 Mediterranean Games
Mediterranean Games medalists in athletics